Fly Project is a Romanian dance group from Bucharest, Romania, created in 2005 by Tudor Ionescu.

Career
Tudor Ionescu and Dan Deneș release their debut album Fly Project, in 2005. Their first single, "Raisa", was number one in Romania.

In 2007, Fly Project released "K-tinne", another instant success which got them many music awards including the Romanian Top Hits Best Dance and Romanian Top Hits Best Song awards. This was just a prequel to their second album, which registered record sales and broke all booking milestones, managing to secure the most concert bookings in one year.

Following their short musical hits, the band released "Brasil", which similarly topped charts in Romania, Russia, Greece, Spain, Moldova, Turkey, the Netherlands, Serbia and Hungary. Furthermore, the single was nominated for "Best Dance Song" at Romanian Music Awards.

Annually, their next hit singles,  "Mandala", "Goodbye", "Musica", "Back In My Life" and "Toca Toca" kept Fly Project as number 1 in the International music charts, from Russia to The Netherlands, India, Greece and Latin America.
Fly Project latest single, "Toca Toca" was very popular countries like Italy, Russia, Ukraine, France, Spain, Mexico, Turkey and it continues to be in the music top charts going up even after one year after being released. Fly Project hits again with "Toca Toca" and gets a new Gold Disc for the units they sold in Italy.

In 2014, they won "Best Dance Award", with "Toca Toca", and the "Border Breaker Award", for their international success, at the Romanian Music Awards, marking one of the most important events in the Romanian music industry. Eska Awards is another important event, which takes place in the fall of 2014 in Poland, where Fly Project conquers the audience with its hits. Also, in September 2014, Fly Project took a part in television show Jaka la Melodia, awarded for TV entertainment in Poland. In November 2014, Fly Project has an exceptional show at the Gran Canaria 40 Pop Fashion & Friends, an event of the 40 Principal's radio network in the Canary Islands. With over 40,000 participants, the venue had better stage lighting and monitor system.

In 2015, the group began collaboration with Like a Star. After continuing #MostWanted international tour in June 2015, Fly Project released "So High".  In their eleventh anniversary, they released "Next To You". In March 2016, Tudor and Dan released "Tenerife", featuring Romanian artist Misha and DJ Sava. Furthermore, they collaborated for single "Jolie". In the fall of 2016, Fly Project released "Butterfly", featuring Andra and in 2019, they released "Mexico".

As of 2021, Ionescu became the sole member of Fly Project.

Members 

 Tudor Ionescu (born 3 November 1979, in Brașov)

Discography

Albums

Singles

As lead artist

As featured artist

Other charted songs

Awards and nominations

Notes

References

Further reading
VIDEO! Fly Project canta la ziua lui Roberto Carlos, a1.ro, 13 Aprilie 2011 
Fly Project a cântat pentru Roberto Carlos, libertatea.ro, 13 Aprilie 2011

External links
 Official website

2005 establishments in Romania
House music duos
Musical groups established in 2005
Romanian Eurodance groups
Trance music groups